Lizzy Mack is a vocalist from the United Kingdom. She had a No. 49 hit as the featured artist on the Fits of Gloom cover of "The Power of Love" and a No. 52 hit with her version of the Yazoo song "Don't Go".

References

British women singers
British women in electronic music
Eurodance musicians
MCA Records artists